Michał Kwiatkowski (born 12 November 1983) is a Polish singer. In France, he is better known as Michal.

Biography
Kwiatkowski was born and raised in Gorzów Wielkopolski. In 2001, Michał won a Polish talent show Szansa na sukces (Shot at the Top). After this success, he left Poland and started his studies in France. In 2003, he competed in the third series of the popular show Star Academy. His popularity increased rapidly. He gained second place, but winner Elodie Frégé shared the victory with him.

From September 2009 he was a member of X edition in Dancing with the Stars in Poland. His partner was Janja Lesar. They were eliminated in 11th episode, placing third.

Personal life
In December 2012, Michal publicly came out as gay in an interview with French magazine Tele Loisir. Since 2015 he has been in a relationship with French producer of entertainment programs Maxim Assenza.

Discography

Studio albums

Singles

References

1983 births
Living people
People from Gorzów Wielkopolski
Star Academy (France) participants
French-language singers
Polish pop singers
Polish gay musicians
Polish LGBT singers
Gay singers
21st-century Polish male singers